The reddish-brown bearded saki (Chiropotes sagulatus) is a species of bearded saki, a type of New World monkey, endemic to Brazil, French Guiana, Guyana, and Suriname. The IUCN notes that this is possibly a synonym for Chiropotes israelita, though the two populations of sakis may be distinct species.

References 

Taxa named by Thomas Stewart Traill
Mammals described in 1821